Paul Charpentier (born 1 May 2000) is an Argentine professional footballer who plays as a forward for Nueva Chicago.

Club career
Charpentier got his senior career underway with Nueva Chicago. The 2016–17 campaign in Primera B Nacional saw Charpentier make the breakthrough into senior, professional football, with the forward coming off the substitutes bench in a defeat away to Juventud Unida on 21 June 2017 for his debut; he was aged seventeen at the time. He made four more appearances that season, whilst also netting his first goal during a home match with eventual champions Argentinos Juniors in July. In 2017, Charpentier had a trial with River Plate; without the permission of Nueva Chicago, who accused them of tapping up the player.

International career
In February 2018, Charpentier received a call-up to train with the Argentina U19s.

Career statistics
.

References

External links

2000 births
Living people
Place of birth missing (living people)
Argentine footballers
Association football forwards
Primera Nacional players
Primera B Metropolitana players
Nueva Chicago footballers
Sacachispas Fútbol Club players